Martin Francis Betkouski (1860 – 1942) was a member of the Los Angeles City Council between 1910 and 1918.

Public service
In 1906 Betkouski was a member of the Los Angeles Fire Commission.

A Los Angeles County grand jury in 1917 accused him as a City Council member of misconduct in office in connection with property transactions in the area where Union Station (Los Angeles) was eventually built.

According to the Los Angeles Times, the councilman, from the Seventh Ward, was alleged "to have realized a profit of more than $50,000 by securing options on property within the terminal site, before the owners were aware of the proposed improvement." He was also said to have received a check of "several thousand dollars" from attorney Isadore Dockweiler, who represented the terminal company.

Betkouski ran for reelection in 1917, placing 15th in a field of eighteen candidates, of whom only the first nine were successful in a first-past-the post election.

The grand jury accusation was dropped after Betkouski lost the election on the grounds that the only penalty he might suffer would be removal from office. In the same year, 1917, Betkouski was elected a member of the Los Angeles Board of Trade.

Personal life
He was born in San Francisco, California, and moved to Los Angeles in 1887. He died shortly before May 8, 1942, in his home, 1840 Canyon Drive, Hollywood, survived by his wife, Mary E. Betkouski, a son, Marcellian R. Betkouski, and two daughters, Marie C. Betkouski and Margaret T. Betkouski. Interment was at Calvary Cemetery.

References

Additional reading
 Paul R. Spizzeri, Homestead Museum, "'In the Big City Class': A Progress Map of the Union Terminal Warehouse District of Los Angeles, April and September 1917," The Homestead Blog, September 17, 2019 

1860 births
1942 deaths
Politicians from  San Francisco
Burials at Calvary Cemetery (Los Angeles)
Los Angeles City Council members